Dimi Mint Abba (‎; 25 December 1958 – June 2011) was one of Mauritania's most famous musicians. She was born Loula Bint Siddaty Ould Abba in Tidjikja in Mauritania.  1958, into a low-caste ("iggawin") family specializing in the griot tradition.

Life and career
Dimi's parents were both musicians (her father had been asked to compose the Mauritanian national anthem), and she began playing at an early age. Her professional career began in 1976, when she sang on the radio and then competed, the following year, in the Umm Kulthum Contest in Tunis. Her winning song "Sawt Elfan" ("Art's Plume") has the refrain "Art's Plume is a balsam, a weapon and a guide enlightening the spirit of men", which can be interpreted to mean that artists play a more important role than warriors in society.

Her first international release was on the World Circuit record label, following a recommendation from Ali Farka Touré. On this album, she was accompanied by her husband Khalifa Ould Eide and her two daughters.

Later she composed famous and popular Mauritanian songs like "Hailala" and "Koumba bay bay". She died on June 4, 2011, in Casablanca, Morocco following a stage accident in Aioun ten days earlier when she was singing for Sahrawi public. Dimi in her lifetime had toured African countries widely, Europe in (1989) and (2006) respectively, the United States (US) in (1993), Australia in (2009).

She died of a cerebral hemorrhage. Her death was described as "a national loss" by Mohamed Ould Abdel Aziz, the former President of Mauritania.

Discography
Albums
Khalifa Ould Eide & Dimi Mint Abba, Moorish Music from Mauritania. World Circuit WCD 019, 1990.
Dimi Mint Abba, Music and Songs of Mauritania, Auvidis Ethnic 1992.

Contributing artist
The Rough Guide to West African Music, World Music Network, 1995
 Unwired: Africa, World Music Network, 2000

See also
Music of Mauritania

References

External links
Sharjah Art Foundation
BBC Press Release on her 2006 appearance in The Proms.
BBC Recording of her 2006 appearance at WOMAD.
BBC Report on her 2004 appearance at WOMAD.
Mondomix
Afropop worldwide
 Culturebase (in German)

1958 births
2011 deaths
Mauritanian women singers
Mauritanian music
World Circuit (record label) artists
Mauritanian songwriters